The Pic de Petit Rochebrune (or, simply, Petit Rochebrune) is a mountain in the Cottian Alps belonging to the French department of Hautes-Alpes.

Etymology 

The literal English translation of Pic de Rochebrune can be dark rock peak or brown rock peak. Petit means small, and refers to the fact that the mountain is smaller than the neighbouring Pic de Rochebrune.

Geography 
The mountain is located on the ridge dividing the Queyras (valley of the Guil, a tributary of the Durance) from the valley of the Cerveyrette, another tributary of the Durance. Administratively is shared bey the municipalities of Cervières and Aiguilles.

Nature conservation 
The Pic de Petit Rochebrune is located on the northern border of the regional nature park of Queyras (Parc naturel régional du Queyras ), established in 1977.

Access to the summit 
The easiest route to reach the summit starts from Les Fonts, a village of Cervières. The mountain is also a well known destination for winter ski mountaineering.

Mountain huts 
 Refuge Fonts de Cervières - 2040 m

Maps
 French  official cartography (Institut géographique national - IGN); on-line version:  www.geoportail.fr

References

Alpine three-thousanders
Mountains of the Alps
Mountains of Hautes-Alpes